This is a list of Norwegian football transfers in the 2021–2022 winter transfer window by club. Only clubs of the 2022 Eliteserien and 2022 1. divisjon are included.

Eliteserien

Aalesund

In:

Out:

Bodø/Glimt

In:

Out:

HamKam

In:

Out:

Haugesund

In:

Out:

Jerv

In:

Out:

Kristiansund

In:

Out:

Lillestrøm

In:

Out:

Molde

In:

Out:

Odd

In:

Out:

Rosenborg

In:

Out:

Sandefjord

In:

Out:

Sarpsborg 08

In:

Out:

Strømsgodset

In:

Out:

Tromsø

In:

Out:

Viking

In:

Out:

Vålerenga

In:

Out:

1. divisjon

Brann

In:

Out:

Bryne

In:

Out:

Fredrikstad

In:

Out:

Grorud

In:

Out:

KFUM

In:

Out:

Kongsvinger

In:

Out:

Mjøndalen

In:

Out:

Ranheim

In:

Out:

Raufoss

In:

Out:

Sandnes Ulf

In:

Out:

Skeid

In:

Out:

Sogndal

In:

Out:

Stabæk

In:

Out:

Start

In:

Out:

Stjørdals-Blink

In:

Out:

Åsane

In:

Out:

References

Further reading
Brann Bryne Fredrikstad Grorud KFUM Kongsvinger Mjøndalen Ranheim Raufoss Sandnes Ulf Skeid Sogndal Stabæk Start Stjørdals-Blink Åsane

Norway
Transfers
Transfers
2021-22